Leptospermum parvifolium, commonly known as lemon-scented tea-tree, is a species of shrub that is endemic to eastern Australia. It has thin, rough bark, egg-shaped leaves with the narrower end towards the base, white or pink flowers, and fruit with the remains of the sepals attached but that is shed when the seeds are mature.

Description
The flower buds have sometimes large, egg-shaped, reddish brown bracts and bracteoles at the base but that usually fall as the flower opens. Flowering mainly occurs from September to November and the fruit is a capsule that has the remnants of the sepals attached but that falls off soon after the end of the flowering season.

Taxonomy and naming
The type specimen of L. parvifolium was collected by Surgeon John White at Port Jackson in 1795. The plant first appeared in scientific literature in 1797, in the Transactions of the Linnean Society of London published by the eminent 18th century botanist James Edward Smith. The specific epithet (parvifolium) is derived from  Latin, meaning ‘’small leaves’’.

Distribution and habitat
Leptospermum parvifolium grows in dry sclerophyll forest on shallow soils, especially in sandy and rocky areas. It is widespread and common on the northern and central slopes and tablelands, and on the south coast as far south as Nowra. It has also been recorded in south-eastern Queensland.

References

parvifolium
Myrtales of Australia
Flora of New South Wales
Flora of Queensland
Plants described in 1797
Taxa named by James Edward Smith